Attire of Mangalorean Catholics refers to the traditional clothing of the Mangalorean Catholics from the Mangalore Diocese (erstwhile South Canara district) on the southwestern coast of India.

Costumes

Mangalorean Catholic men used to wear long loose frilled white or black coats known as kutav with buttons (a loose coat that draws from Moghul-era sherwanis), over a loose shirt zibbo (similar to short-kurtas), while a sarong called pudvem (dhoti), a piece of unstitched cloth, usually around 7 yards long, was wrapped around the waist, and in between the legs to be knotted at the waist. The turbans were usually flattened like the Coorgi turbans (Mundaas or Urmal). In modern times, this mode has changed. Only a few old people can be seen wearing this traditional dress on church going occasions.

Before marriage, women used to wear a kirgi (half saree) and baju (blouse). The kirgi is a piece of cloth, not longer than four feet and about three feet broad. It was wrapped around the body from the waist down. A jacket called baju with long sleeves was used to cover the upper part of the body. This dress was a sign of her virginity and she wore for the last time during the Ros ceremony. The kirgi was wrapped around the waist, but the end of the sari is not thrown over the shoulder.  To wear the full sari with its end thrown over the shoulder, known as worl, was the exclusive right of a married woman. Married women used to wear sarees the general way. The salwar kameez and longyis is another form of popular dress for contemporary females and males.

The Mangalorean Catholic bride's wedding sari (drape) is known as sado. It is usually a red coloured Benaresi sari made of finely woven silk decorated with elaborate gold embroidery called zàri (brocade). In olden days, the bride wore on her head a red cloth, three feet long and as many broad. After the wedding was over, the Sado was well preserved and worn only on feast-days or for weddings and any other grand functions. Sometimes a particularly precious sado was handed down from mother to daughter and considered a valuable heirloom. The cost of a sado was reckoned in varahas. Saris are known for their variety by special names, such as Katari, Shilari, Gulabi, etc. Both the sado and Dharma sado were costly saris, while the sado was the most expensive, the Dharma Sado was the second most expensive. Some Mangalorean Catholic brides also wear a white sari during the Nuptial Blessing in Church, but however this style of dress has waned in the recent years.  The bridegroom's dress in the early times consisted of a short sarong of hand-woven cloth (dhoti), a shawl to cover his shoulders and a red handkerchief on the head (leis). The groom's dress was gradually improved. Later, his dress consisted of a white sarong with a red and gold hem (todop), a shirt with gold buttons and a coat (kutav), a shawl on the shoulders and a towel (Urmal) on the head. The bridegroom wore a chakrasar (neck chain) around his neck. He wore a pair of sandals or at least a pair of socks. In present times, many westernised Mangalorean Catholic couples and particularly the diaspora outside South Canara, have taken to a Victorian style White weddings in which the bridegroom usually wears a two-piece black tie suit, while the bride wears a white wedding gown to Church ceremony,  Nevertheless, since the 1960s, some families have adopted and preserved a "fusion wedding" subculture and will follow the rules and rituals in varying degrees. After Toast raising, Wedding cake-cutting, the First couple dance& other Western rituals are done, the newly-weds will change over into Eastern wear and re-enter in a second Wedding march at the Wedding reception venue; Eastern wear today comprises pudvem (a light coloured silk dhoti) that is usually off-white or whitish yellow, and a dark coloured short-sherwani for the groom, while the bride wears a sado (red sari) with a full-length bodice or blouse (choli), this is followed by a number of native Konkani (paik) rituals, the most prominent among which is the tying of pirduk, a hybridised piece of jewellery drawing from thaali (Indian bridal necklace) and a Christian pendant blest by a priest during the Church wedding ceremony.

Ornaments
The earliest bridal ornament was the pirduk around the neck. It was a necklace of black glass beads strung on a thread made of the fibres of dried pineapple (ananas) leaves. This necklace was to be worn as long as the husband was alive; a widow had to take it off. It was highly prized by the women as the symbol of their married state. The pirduk could consist of a single row of beads, but in old times it often consisted of three rows. The beads were black probably because black never fades or changes. As the years passed more lustre was added to the beads.

The ordinary crude pattern of the pirduk was improved in the course of time. Later longish beads of gold were inserted between the black glass beads and a pendant was added. The earliest pendant was a round disk of silver. It was called thali. Later it was changed into a golden pendant. Finally the pendant was replaced by a gold medal bearing the picture of Our Lady. This ornament is still in use in some places. Elsewhere in South Canara the pirduk has now the form of a half-moon surmounted by a cross and studded with pearls or precious stones. It is worn on the chest on a string of pineapple fibres on which gold and black glass beads are strung alternately. Another form of the pendant consists of a cross studded with precious stones. To the top of the cross is attached the figure of a dove, symbol of the Holy Ghost. While the former pendant is called minin, the latter shape is called sorpoli. It is worn on a gold chain without glass beads. At present, the necklace is made of black beads, strung on a gold wire as either as a single chain or double chain with a connecting pendant.

Besides this main ornament a bride used to wear the following
other ornaments:
 On the neck: the kanti, a necklace of red coral beads and gold beads, between eight or ten coral beads a larger gold bead being inserted, hung down to the breast; the chakrasar consisting of a series of small round gold plates woven one into the other and forming a long chain; the fugodor, a necklace of large green stones mounted in gold.
On the ear: The most ancient ear ornament was called kap. It consisted of a round disk inserted into the lobe of the ear. It is still the typical ear ornament for married women in Canara. The weight of the kap extended the hole of the earlobes so much that the earlobes of old women hang down very low. In the course of time the kap fell into disuse among the younger generation and was replaced by a more elaborate ornament, the pespes, which is similar to the kap. In the present time the ear ornament most commonly worn is the so-called kudar (pl. kudkan), a round gold disk surrounded by precious stones. Another ear-ornament was the karap, inserted in the middle ear. A thin gold chain was attached to it which was fastened in the hair. On top of the ear the bride wore the mugud, a gold disk surrounded by pearls. The mugud too was attached to the hair by a golden chain.
Head ornaments: First was a gold pin struck through the bun of hair at the back of the head. For a bride it was a silver pin with a gold head, often ornamented. It was called kanto. The bride wore a pair of combs (dantoni). Two ordinary combs were purchased and the upper part of each one was plated with gold. They are worn in the hair on both sides of the head over the ears. Two more combs were worn by the bride, with a figure of a fish in gold inserted in each comb. These combs were therefore called masli (fish). In the centre of the forehead where the hair is parted, a gold chain was placed with a pendant. This chain was called bang. It was also used by the Hindu bride.
Arm ornaments: Every bride formerly wore three pairs of gold bangles; in addition she wore bangles of red glass. A bride must also wear one or several gold rings on her fingers.

These were the traditional ornaments for a bride on her wedding day. The less sophisticated country brides still wear them though in the towns they have been replaced by modern jewellery. The modern tendency is to wear a lesser number of ornaments, but the few ornaments worn are more valuable through the addition of precious stones and through a more refined workmanship. A widow had to wear a black sari all her life, and was not allowed to wear ornaments.

Notes
a  The Hindus call it mangalsutra or mangala sutra (the auspicious necklace). It is the symbol of the married state.
b  This was probably imported from Kerala where the thali is the symbol of the married state. The bridegroom has to tie it around the neck of the bride during the wedding.
c  Some fifty years ago the old women still wore black glass bangles and even copper bangles. The Vakkal women wear bangles of black glass on both arms even at the present time.

Citations

References

Culture of Mangalore